The Toyota Corolla Verso is a car produced by the Japanese carmaker Toyota between 2001 and 2009. A compact MPV, the first-generation Corolla Verso sold in Europe was a rebadged Japanese market second-generation Corolla Spacio (E120), which was first released in Japan in May 2001. The second-generation model became a separate model in March 2004, based on the second-generation Avensis (T250), until production ceased in March 2009 and production of its replacement, the Verso, began.

Although the design of the car is based on the Verso's namesake, the Corolla, the second-generation model does not share a platform with the Corolla, instead being built on a separate unique platform.



First generation (E120; 2001) 

The second generation Corolla Spacio entered the European market as the first generation Corolla Verso after being shown at the September 2001 Frankfurt Motor Show.

Second generation (AR10; 2004) 

The second generation Corolla Verso was unveiled at the 2004 Geneva Motor Show.

Being internally coded as the AR10 platform (AUR10 with AD engine, ZNR10 with 3ZZ engine, ZNR10 with 1ZZ engine), the second generation Corolla Verso was one of the first Toyota vehicles to be designed outside Japan, assembled in Adapazarı, Sakarya, Turkey, and designed at Toyota's European design centre in the south of France. 

This generation was designed by Toyota Europe Design Development (Sophia-Antipolis, France) and primarily aimed at the European market, where it became one of the best selling compact MPVs. 

The second generation Corolla Verso was offered with four choices of engines; a 1.6- and a 1.8-litre petrol, a 2.0- or 2.2-litre diesel. The European specification Corolla Verso was available in Europe, Morocco, Kenya and South Africa. It was not sold in Japan at all.

Safety 

The Euro NCAP test showed the Corolla Verso to have slightly higher side protection than the front in a crash.

References 

Verso
Compact MPVs
Euro NCAP small MPVs
Cars introduced in 2001
Cars discontinued in 2009
2000s cars
Front-wheel-drive vehicles